Haakon, Crown Prince of Norway (Haakon Magnus; born 20 July 1973) is the heir apparent to the Norwegian throne. He is the only son of King Harald V and Queen Sonja.

Haakon represents the fourth generation of the sitting Norwegian royal family of the House of Glücksburg. He married Mette-Marit Tjessem Høiby, with whom he has two children, Princess Ingrid Alexandra and Prince Sverre Magnus.

Haakon has been a member of the Young Global Leaders network, its Foundation, a Goodwill Ambassador for the United Nations, and a philanthropist.  He is a trained naval officer and, as crown prince, a top military official in the Norwegian Armed Forces. He holds a BA in Political Science from the University of California, Berkeley, and an MSc in Development Studies from the London School of Economics.

Family and early life 
Haakon was born on 20 July 1973 at The National Hospital in St Hanshaugen, Oslo, the only son and younger child of Crown Prince Harald and Crown Princess Sonja. His father was the son of the reigning Norwegian monarch, Olav V. At birth he was named Haakon Magnus, and it was stressed in the announcement that he would go by the name Haakon. He was baptised in the Church of Norway on 20 September 1973 in the chapel of the Royal Palace. He was named in honour of his paternal great-grandfather, Haakon VII, and his maternal uncle Haakon Haraldsen. When Haakon was only 17, his grandfather Olav died on 17 January 1991, leading to the ascension of his father as King Harald V and himself as crown prince.

Haakon has one sibling, Princess Märtha Louise of Norway (born 1971). In 1990, the Norwegian constitution was altered, granting absolute primogeniture to the Norwegian throne, meaning that the eldest child, regardless of gender, takes precedence in the line of succession. This was not, however, done retroactively (as, for example, Sweden had done in 1980), meaning that Haakon continues to take precedence over his older sister.

Education and military 
Haakon served in the Royal Norwegian Navy. He graduated from the Norwegian Naval Academy in 1995, followed with a year aboard missile torpedo boats and navy vessels.

He attended and received a Bachelor of Arts degree in political science from the University of California, Berkeley in 1999. Haakon later attended lectures at the University of Oslo and took the Norwegian Ministry of Foreign Affairs' civil servant introductory course in 2001. He completed his education in 2003 at the London School of Economics, where he was awarded an MSc in development studies, specializing in international trade and Africa.

As of 15 November 2013, in the Royal Norwegian Navy his officer rank is Admiral, and in the Norwegian Army and the Royal Norwegian Air Force his rank is General.

In 2016 he completed the Norwegian Army's paratrooper course and was certified as a military paratrooper. The course attended was administered by the Special Operations Commando.

Marriage and children 

Haakon married a commoner and single mother Mette-Marit Tjessem Høiby on 25 August 2001, at Oslo Cathedral. Frederik, Crown Prince of Denmark was the best man. When the engagement between Crown Prince Haakon and Høiby was announced, many Norwegians felt that his choice of wife was inappropriate. This was primarily about her being a single mother, but information concerning her involvement in the rave scene in Oslo, which included a significant drug-subculture, also added to the controversy. In addition, the father of her child was convicted of drug-related offences. In a heartfelt press conference before the wedding the bride explained her past, saying among other things that her youthful rebelliousness might have been stronger than most young people. The issue of Mette-Marit's past was an ongoing discussion in Norwegian public discourse in the early years after their engagement and marriage

The couple have two children together: Princess Ingrid Alexandra of Norway (born 21 January 2004 at Oslo University National Hospital in Oslo) and Prince Sverre Magnus (born 3 December 2005 in Oslo University National Hospital in Oslo). Haakon is also the stepfather to Mette-Marit's son, Marius Borg Høiby. The Skaugum Estate, situated in the area of Semsvannet, is their official residence.

Activities 

From 25 November 2003 to 12 April 2004, Haakon was regent during the King's treatment for cancer and the subsequent convalescence period. Likewise, Haakon was regent from 29 March 2005 until the King had fully recovered from the heart surgery he underwent on 1 April. This period ended on 7 June.

In addition to his official duties, Haakon has a strong interest in cultural matters. He also has given patronage to a number of organisations. In 2006, Haakon was one of three founders of Global Dignity, alongside Pekka Himanen and John Hope Bryant.

In 2003, the Crown Prince was appointed as Goodwill Ambassador for the United Nations Development Programme (UNDP). In 2013, Crown Prince Haakon established the SIKT conference. The Crown Prince attends the annual conference of the Confederation of Norwegian Enterprise (NHO), and met the Norwegian Confederation of Trade Unions (LO) for an introduction in the Tripartite cooperation in 2016.

Crown Prince Haakon was a member of the Young Global Leaders network from 2005 until 2010. From 2010 until 2017, the Crown Prince served as a member of the Young Global Leaders Foundation Board.

Crown Prince Haakon and Crown Princess Mette-Marit established The Crown Prince and Crown Princess's Foundation. He is a patron of 4H Norge, ANSA, The Ibsen Stage Festival, Nordland Music Festival, and several other organizations. In 2017, he became a patron of the Norwegian Refugee Council.

In May 2022 Haakon joined an expedition from the University of Tromsø aimed at disseminating knowledge about polar history and the critical scientific research taking place in the Arctic for two weeks and crossed the Greenland ice sheet using a snowkite.

In response to the 2022 Oslo shooting, Haakon told reporters, "We must protect the right in Norway to love whomever we want."

Personal interests 
Haakon was involved in several sports and seemed to take a particular liking to windsurfing and surfing, although he has not engaged in serious competitions. Haakon is known as a big music fan. When he was younger, he attended music festivals all over Europe, including the Roskilde Festival in Denmark and the Quart Festival in Kristiansand, Norway.

He has also been part of Olympics ceremonies. In 1994, the Crown Prince and his father played roles during the opening ceremony in Lillehammer: while the King declared the Games opened, the Crown Prince lit the cauldron, paying tribute to his father and grandfather having served as Olympians. In 2016, his daughter Princess Ingrid Alexandra did the same at the II Winter Youth Olympics, which was also held in Lillehammer. In 2010, Haakon attended the opening ceremony of the Winter Olympics in Vancouver.

He accompanied the band Katzenjammer in their recording of the song "Vi tenner våre lykter" (i.e., ‘We light our lanterns’ for the 2011 Christmas-themed album of the same name). Proceeds benefited "Their Royal Highnesses The Crown Prince and Crown Princess funds."

Titles, styles, honours and awards

Titles
20 July 1973 – 17 January 1991: His Royal Highness Prince Haakon of Norway
Since 17 January 1991: His Royal Highness The Crown Prince of Norway

Arms

Honours and medals

National honours and medals
 Grand Cross with Collar of the Order of Saint Olav °
 Grand Cross of Order of Merit °
 Defence Service Medal with Laurel Branch °
 Royal House Centennial Medal °
 Olav V's Commemorative Medal °
 Olav V's Jubilee Medal °
 Olav V's Centenary Medal °
 King Harald V's Jubilee Medal 1991-2016
 Royal Norwegian Navy Service Medal °
 Norwegian Reserve Officers' Association Badge of Honour °
 Naval Society Medal of Merit in gold °
 Oslo Military Society Badge of Honour in Gold °

Foreign honours
 : Grand Decoration in Gold with Sash of the Order of Honour for Services to the Republic of Austria
 : Grand Cross of the Order of the Southern Cross
 : Grand Cross of the Order of the Balkan Mountains
 : Knight of Order of the Elephant ° (20 July 1991)
 : Member 1st Class of Order of the Cross of Terra Mariana ° (10 April 2002)
 : Member 1st Class of Order of the White Star (26 August 2014)
 : Commander Grand Cross of the Order of the White Rose °
 : Grand Cross 1st Class of the Order of Merit of the Federal Republic of Germany °
 : Grand Cross of the Order of the Falcon.
 : Knight Grand Cross of the Order of Merit of the Italian Republic ° (20 September 2004)
 : Grand Cordon of the Order of the Chrysanthemum
 : Grand Cordon of the Supreme Order of the Renaissance
 : Commander Grand Cross of the Order of the Three Stars (20 September 2000) °
 : Recipient of the 1st Class of Cross of Recognition ° (12 March 2015)
 : Grand Cross of the Order of Vytautas the Great ° (23 March 2011) °
 : Grand Cross of the Order of Adolph of Nassau °
 : Knight Grand Cross with Swords of the Order of Orange-Nassau °
 : HM King Willem-Alexander Investiture Medal
 : Grand Cross of the Order of Merit of the Republic of Poland ° (16 September 2003)
 : Grand Cross of the Order of Infante Henry ° (13 February 2004)
 : Recipient of Golden Order for Merits ° (6 November 2019)
 : Knight Grand Cross of the Order of Charles III ° (26 May 2006)
 : Knight of the Royal Order of the Seraphim °

Awards
 14 August Committee's Bridge Building Prize 2011
  Olympic Games : Lighter of the Olympic Cauldron; 1994 Winter Olympics in Lillehammer, opened by his father, King Harald V.
 A horse race bears his name, Kronprins Haakons Pokalløp. It is held every year in June, at Drammen Travpark.

See also 
 List of current heirs apparent

References

External links

 Haakon's biography on the Royal Court's official website
 Haakon, Norges kronprins. NRK interview for his 18th birthday
 (translation of title: – The couple, the Crown Prince and Crown Princess, are doing political work) "- Kronprinsparet driver politisk arbeid" 

House of Glücksburg (Norway)
Regents of Norway
Royal Norwegian Naval Academy alumni
Alumni of the London School of Economics
University of Oslo alumni
1973 births
Living people
Crown Princes of Norway
UC Berkeley College of Letters and Science alumni
Norwegian people of German descent
Norwegian people of English descent
Norwegian people of Danish descent
Norwegian people of Swedish descent
Norwegian people of French descent
Norwegian Lutherans
Olympic cauldron lighters
Royal Norwegian Navy admirals
Norwegian Army generals
Royal Norwegian Air Force generals

Grand Crosses of the Order of Merit of the Republic of Poland
Grand Crosses of the Order of Prince Henry
Grand Crosses Special Class of the Order of Merit of the Federal Republic of Germany
Knights Grand Cross of the Order of the Falcon
Grand Crosses of the Order of Vytautas the Great
Knights Grand Cross of the Order of Merit of the Italian Republic
Knights Grand Cross of the Order of Orange-Nassau
Recipients of the Order of the Cross of Terra Mariana, 1st Class
Recipients of the Grand Decoration with Sash for Services to the Republic of Austria
Recipients of the Cross of Recognition
Recipients of the Order of the White Star, 1st Class
Sons of kings
Heirs apparent